Paul Lynch (born 1977) is an Irish writer living in Dublin, Ireland.

Biography
Lynch was born in Limerick, Ireland, in 1977 and grew up in County Donegal. His first novel Red Sky in Morning won him acclaim in the United States and France, where the book was a finalist for France's Prix du Meilleur Livre Etranger (Best Foreign Book Award). His second novel, The Black Snow, won France's bookseller prize, Prix Libr’à Nous for best foreign novel. Grace, his third novel, was selected as the Kerry Group Irish Novel of the Year and was shortlisted for the Walter Scott Prize for Historical Fiction.

Lynch was the chief film critic of the Sunday Tribune from 2007 to 2011. He had previously served from 2004 as the paper's deputy chief-sub editor. He has written regularly for The Sunday Times on film and has also written for The Irish Times, The Sunday Business Post, The Irish Daily Mail and Film Ireland.

Awards 
 Ireland Francophonie Ambassadors’ Literary Award, winner 2020
 The Kerry Group Irish Novel of the Year Award, winner 2018
 The Walter Scott Prize, shortlisted 2018,
 The William Saroyan International Prize, shortlisted 2018
 Prix Jean-Monnet de Littérature Européenne, shortlisted 2019
 Prix Littérature Monde, shortlisted 2019
 Grand Prix de L'Héroïne, shortlisted 2019
 Prix Libr’à Nous for Best Foreign Novel, winner 2016
 Prix des Lecteurs Privat, winner 2016
 Ireland Francophonie Ambassadors’ Literary Award, shortlisted 2016
 Prix du Meilleur Livre Étranger, finalist 2014
 Prix Femina, nominated 2015
 Prix du Premier Roman, nominated 2014
 Prix du Roman Fnac, nominated 2015
 Best Newcomer at Bord Gais Irish Books of the Year, shortlisted 2013

Novels
 Red Sky in Morning. London: Quercus, 2013. New York: Little, Brown, 2013
 The Black Snow. London: Quercus, 2014. New York: Little, Brown, 2015
 Grace. London: Oneworld, 2017. New York: Little, Brown, 2017
 Beyond the Sea. London: Oneworld, 2019. New York: Farrar, Straus and Giroux, 2020

References

External links 
 http://www.paullynchwriter.com/

1977 births
20th-century Irish novelists
20th-century Irish male writers
Irish male novelists
Living people
Irish writers
21st-century Irish novelists
Irish novelists
21st-century Irish male writers